This list of countries by electric energy consumption is mostly based on the Energy Information Administration. 
Several non-sovereign entities are also included for information purposes, with their parent state noted. 
The per capita data for many countries may be slightly inaccurate as population data may not be for the same year as the consumption data. 
Population data were obtained mainly from the World Bank in 2019 with some exceptions, in which case they were obtained from the Wikipedia pages for the corresponding countries/territories. Average power per capita was calculated according to the formula: 
Electric energy per capita [ in watt-hour ] = Total population electricity consumption [in kW·h/yr] × 1,000 /population.
Electric power per capita [ in watt ] = Total population electricity consumption [in kW·h/yr] × 0.114077116 /population.

 1 kW·h/yr = 1,000 Wh/(365.25 × 24) h = 0.11408 Watt

See also
World energy supply and consumption
Electric energy consumption
List of countries by energy consumption per capita
List of countries by energy intensity
List of countries by energy production
List of countries by renewable electricity production
List of countries by total primary energy consumption and production

References

External links

consumption
electricity consumption
Electricity consumption
Energy consumption
Electricity consumption